Rafael Montero (born October 17, 1990) is a Dominican professional baseball pitcher for the Houston Astros of Major League Baseball (MLB).  Montero signed with the New York Mets as an international free agent in 2011, and made his MLB debut with them in 2014. He has also played in MLB for the Texas Rangers and Seattle Mariners.

Minor League career
Montero signed with the New York Mets as an international free agent on January 20, 2011.  Nearing his 21st birthday he signed at a much older age than most Dominican players. In his first professional season he went 5-4 with a 2.15 ERA and 66 strikeouts in 71 innings.

In 2012, Montero went 11-5 with a 2.36 ERA, with 110 strikeouts and 19 walks in 122 innings. Prior to the 2013 season, Baseball America ranked him as the Mets' fifth best prospect. He started the season with the Double-A Binghamton Mets. He was promoted to Triple-A Las Vegas 51s in June.

In 2013, with Binghamton and Las Vegas went 12-7 with a 2.43 ERA with Binghamton and a 3.05 ERA with Las Vegas, with 150 strikeouts and 35 walks in 154.4 innings pitched.

Major League career

New York Mets

2014

Montero was promoted on May 14, 2014, with Dillon Gee going to the disabled list with a lat strain. Montero started against the New York Yankees at Citi Field on the same day. In the top of the third inning, he struck out shortstop Derek Jeter for his first major league strikeout on a 3-2 fastball. He earned his second strikeout against Brett Gardner in the top of the fifth inning. Montero earned the loss as the Mets lost 0-4 as he pitched six innings giving up 5 hits, 3 runs, 2 home runs, 2 walks and struck out 3. He was sent down on May 31 to make room for Buddy Carlyle on the roster. On August 11, pitcher Jacob deGrom went on the disabled list with rotator cuff tendinitis. Montero was called up on August 12 in deGrom's place. On August 23, Montero was re-sent back to the 51s to make room for deGrom coming off the disabled list. He was recalled on September 6 as part of the September call-ups. He was later moved to the bullpen on September 13. Montero finished the season with a 1-3 record, 4.06 ERA in 10 games with 42 strikeouts in 44.1 innings pitched with a WHIP of 1.511 while giving up 44 hits, 21 runs (20 of them earned), 8 home runs, and 23 walks.

2015
On April 17, 2015, he was sent down to the 51s to make room for Danny Muno. He was recalled up on April 27 to replace Muno on the roster. A day later he was once again sent down as Jack Leathersich was called up. On April 29, it was discovered that his rotator cuff was swelling and placed on the disabled list. He was placed on the 60-day disabled list on July 24. Montero would never pitch again in 2015. Montero finished the season with a 0-1 record, 4.50 ERA in 5 games (one start) with 13 strikeouts in 10 innings pitched with a WHIP of 1.400 while giving up 9 hits, 6 runs (5 of them earned), and 5 walks.

2016
Montero began the 2016 season with the 51s. He was called up on April 12, with Eric Campbell being demoted to the 51s. Montero made one start with an ERA of 8.02 pitching 19 innings while giving up 23 hits, 17 runs (all earned), 4 walks and 16 strikeouts.

2017
In 2017 he was 5-11 with a 5.52	ERA.

2018: Lost season
Montero underwent Tommy John Surgery after suffering a UCL tear and missed the entire 2018 season. He elected free agency on November 3, 2018.

Texas Rangers

2019
On December 4, 2018, Montero signed a minor-league deal with the Texas Rangers. Starting on June 17, Montero made appearances for the AZL Rangers, Frisco RoughRiders, and Nashville Sounds as he made his way back from Tommy John surgery. On July 22, 2019, the Rangers selected Montero's contract and promoted him to the major leagues. With Texas in 2019, Montero went 2–0 with a 2.48 ERA and 34 strikeouts over 29 innings.

2020
The following year, he was 8-for-8 in save opportunities, the first saves of his major league career, as he recorded a 4.08 ERA and 1.02 WHIP in  innings during the pandemic-shortened season.

Seattle Mariners
On December 15, 2020, Montero was traded to the Seattle Mariners in exchange for Jose Corniell and a player to be named later. The PTBNL, Andres Mesa, was sent to Texas on June 14, 2021.
In 40 games for the Mariners, Montero struggled to a 7.27 ERA with 37 strikeouts.
On July 23, 2021, Montero was designated for assignment by the Mariners.

Houston Astros

2021
On July 27, 2021, Montero was traded to the Houston Astros along with Kendall Graveman in exchange for infielder Abraham Toro and pitcher Joe Smith.  He made four appearances for Houston, allowing one unearned run over six innings, three hits, two walks, and struck out five.

2022
Montero avoided arbitration with the Astros on March 22, 2022, agreeing to a $2.275 million contract for the season.  He earned his first save of the season on April 28 pitching in the ninth versus the Rangers, while yielding a home run to Corey Seager before closing out a 3–2 win.  On May 29, Montero appeared with two runners on and no outs in the seventh innings versus the Seattle Mariners, allowing the only run on a sacrifice bunt before striking out Mike Ford and Luis Torrens to end the inning.  He was the winning pitcher as the Astros won, 2–1 

Montero struck out two on July 3 in a 4–2 victory over the Los Angeles Angels in which Astros pitchers struck out 20 batters to establish a franchise record in a nine inning contest.  Contributing were starter Framber Valdez (first six innings), Héctor Neris (7th), Montero (8th) and Ryan Pressly (9th).  On August 15, Montero endured a rare collapse as he was charged three of four runs in the eighth inning without having recorded an out, taking the loss in a 4–2 defeat versus the Chicago White Sox.  On August 31, 2022, Montero closed out the ninth versus the Rangers for his tenth save, the first time he had recorded double-figures in saves in a season.  

Over the 2022 regular season, Montero  made 71 relief appearances and accumulated  innings, 2.37 ERA, 14 saves, and 5–2 W–L record, and allowed 47 hits, three home runs, and 23 bases on balls with 73 strikeouts.  He ranked third in the AL in pitching appearances, and tied for seventh in holds (23), and ranked second on the Astros pitching staff in both holds and saves.

Montero made his postseason debut on October 11, 2022, in Game 1 of the American League Division Series (ALDS).  He pitched a clean ninth inning was the winning pitcher in an 8–7 Astros' walk-off win over the Mariners.  Montero appeared in each game of the ALDS, delivered  shutout innings, allowed three total baserunners, and struck out three batters.

On November 2, 2022, Montero was put into Game 4 of the World Series to pitch the 8th inning, with a no-hitter on the line.  He came very close to allowing a hit with two outs in the inning on a line drive to right field, but it was caught with ease by right fielder Kyle Tucker.  Montero was then relieved by Ryan Pressly for the 9th inning, who completed the no-hitter.  The Astros defeated the Philadelphipa Phillies in six games to give Montero his first career World Series title.

Following the World Series, Montero became a free agent.

2023
On November 15, 2022, Montero re-signed with the Astros on a 3-year, $34.5 million contract.

Personal life
Montero and his wife, Yasmina, have one daughter who was born in 2020.

See also

 List of Houston Astros no-hitters
 List of Major League Baseball no-hitters
 List of Major League Baseball players from the Dominican Republic

References
Footnotes

Sources

External links

1990 births
Living people
Arizona League Rangers players
Binghamton Mets players
Brooklyn Cyclones players
Dominican Republic expatriate baseball players in the United States
Dominican Summer League Mets players
Frisco RoughRiders players
Gulf Coast Mets players
Houston Astros players
Kingsport Mets players
Las Vegas 51s players
Leones del Escogido players
Major League Baseball pitchers
Major League Baseball players from the Dominican Republic
Nashville Sounds players
New York Mets players
People from Elías Piña Province
Savannah Sand Gnats players
Seattle Mariners players
St. Lucie Mets players
Texas Rangers players
2023 World Baseball Classic players